Shrish Chandra Dikshit  was an Indian Politician and Member of Parliament in the 10th Lok Sabha. Dikshit represented the Varanasi constituency of Uttar Pradesh and was a member of the Bharatiya Janata Party political party. He died in April 2014.

Education & background
Dikshit was born in Raebareli, Uttar Pradesh. He attended the Lucknow University and gained LL.B & M.A. degrees. He was a retired I.P.S officer and after retirement, joined politics in 1984. He died at his hometown in Raebareli on 8 April 2014 and was given full Police honours at his cremation, which as per his instructions was done at an electric crematorium, so as to not waste wood. Also, his ashes were not immersed in the Ganges so as to not pollute it.

Police Service

Shrish Chandra Dikshit received I.P.S training at the Central Police Training College (C.P.T.C), Mount Abu. Dikshit served as First Class Magistrate, Subdivisional District Magistrate (SDM), SP, IG of CID, DG of Home Guard and held the post of DG for state of Uttar Pradesh from 1982 to 1984.

Awards

Dikshit has received following awards as an I.P.S officer.

1973: Indian Police Medal for long and meritorious service.

1980: President's Police Medal for distinguished service.

Politics

In 1984, Dikshit became a member of VHP. Due to his association with VHP and involvement with the Ram Janmabhoomi movement, in 1990 he was arrested and detained.

Dikshit was elected in 10th Lok Sabha from Varanasi constituency as a member of Bharatiya Janata Party.

Posts Held

See also

10th Lok Sabha
Politics of India
Parliament of India
Government of India
Varanasi (Lok Sabha constituency)
Ram Janmabhoomi

References 

India MPs 1991–1996
1926 births
Bharatiya Janata Party politicians from Uttar Pradesh
Lok Sabha members from Uttar Pradesh
Politicians from Varanasi
2014 deaths
Indian police officers
Vishva Hindu Parishad members
People from Raebareli